Reema Fayez Tayyem is a Professor of Nutrition and Food Technology Department at the University of Jordan since 2016.  She was a professor of Nutrition and Food Production in the Department of Clinical Nutrition and Dietetics at Hashemite University’s Faculty of Applied Health Sciences since 2001.  Her research interests include determining the degree of malnutrition among end stage renal disease patients, developing dietary questionnaires and Nutrition and Cancer.  She is also the Editor-in-Chief of the Pakistan Journal of Nutrition.

She earned a BSc in biochemistry and MSc and PhD in Human Nutrition from University of Jordan.

References

Women nutritionists
Academic staff of the University of Jordan
Academic staff of Hashemite University
Living people
Year of birth missing (living people)
University of Jordan alumni
Academic journal editors